Viola is a female given name, a variant of the given name Violet.

List of people

Academics
 Viola Birss, Canadian professor of chemistry
 Viola Garfield, American anthropologist
 Viola Shelly Shantz, American biologist and zoologist

Activists
 Viola Desmond, (1914–1965), African-Nova Scotian civil rights figure
 Viola Hashe (1926–1977), South African anti-apartheid activist
 Viola Hill (1892-?), American suffragist and music director
 Viola Liuzzo, Unitarian Universalist civil rights activist
 Viola Pitts, Fort Worth community activist

Aristocrats
 Viola, Duchess of Opole, 13th-century Bulgarian-Polish noble
 Viola Elisabeth of Cieszyn, Queen of Bohemia and Poland
 Viola Grosvenor, Duchess of Westminster, widow of Robert Grosvenor, 5th Duke of Westminster

Athletes
 Viola Bauer, German cross-country skier
 Viola Cheptoo Lagat (born 1989), Kenyan middle-distance runner
 Viola Goretzki, German rower
 Viola Grahl, German former field hockey player
 Violah Jepchumba (born 1990), Kenyan long-distance runner
 Viola Kibiwot, Kenyan distance runner
 Viola Myers, Canadian athlete
 Viola Odebrecht, German footballer 
 Viola Poley, German rower
 Viola Thomas (born 1939), Canadian barrel rolling champion
 Viola Thompson, American professional baseball player
 Viola Valli, Italian long distance swimmer
 Viola Yanik, Canadian wrestler

Performers
 Viola Allen, American stage actress
 Viola Barry, American silent film actress
 Viola Compton, British film actress
 Viola Dana, American silent film actress
 Viola Davis, American actress
 Viola Farber, American choreographer and dancer
 Viola Gillette, American contralto
 Viola Harris, American actress 
 Viola Keats, British film and television actress
 Viola Lyel, British film and television actress
 Viola Léger, (1930–2023), Acadian-Canadian actress and former Canadian Senator
 Viola McCoy, African-American blues singer
 Viola Richard, American silent film actress
 Viola Smith (1912-2020), American drummer
 Viola Valentino, Italian singer
 Viola Wills, American pop singer

Politicians and administrators
 Viola Baskerville, Secretary of Administration in the Cabinet of Virginia Governor Tim Kaine 
 Viola Jimulla, Chief of the Prescott Yavapai tribe
 Viola B. Sanders, director of Women in the Navy

Writers
 Viola Bayley, British children's writer
 Viola Canales, American writer
 Viola Fischerová, Czech poet and translator
 Viola Florence Barnes, American historian and author
 Viola Garvin, English poet and editor
 Viola Meynell, English writer, novelist and poet
 Viola Roseboro', American editor and novelist
 Viola S. Wendt, American poet and educator

Others
 Viola Frey, American ceramics artist
 Viola Gentry, American aviator
 Viola Haqi, Dutch fashion model
 Viola R. MacMillan, Canadian authority on mining
 Viola Pettus, American nurse
 Viola Slaughter, Arizona rancher and the wife of sheriff John Slaughter
 Viola Spolin, American director and teacher

Fictional characters
Viola, a character from Eternal Sonata
Viola (Kiddy Grade), in the Japanese anime television series Kiddy Grade
Viola (She's the Man), a character in the American film She's the Man
Viola (TimeSplitters), a character in the English video game series TimeSplitters
Viola (Twelfth Night), character in William Shakespeare's play Twelfth Night
Viola (Zone of the Enders), a character in the Japanese video game series Zone of the Enders
Viola, a character in the Soul series of fighting games
Viola, a character from Valkyrie Drive- Bhikkhuni
Viola de Lesseps, heroine of the film Shakespeare in Love
Viola, a Gym Leader in Pokémon series
Viola, one of Jake's five children from Adventure Time
Viola, a character from the anime and manga series, One Piece
Viola, a character from the RPG horror game The Witch's House
Viola, a character from the series "The Knife of Never Letting Go"
Viola, a character from the movie "Chaos Walking"

See also
Viola (surname)
Violette (given name), a female given name
Violetta (given name), a female given name
Violeta (given name), a female given name
Violet (given name), a female given name
Viorica, a female given name

References

Feminine given names
Spanish feminine given names
English feminine given names
German feminine given names
Given names derived from plants or flowers
Hungarian feminine given names
Dutch feminine given names